Alex Box Stadium, Skip Bertman Field is a baseball stadium in Baton Rouge, Louisiana.  It is the home stadium of the Louisiana State University Tigers baseball team. The stadium section (and LSU's previous baseball stadium 200 yards to the north) were named for Simeon Alex Box, an LSU letterman (1942), Purple Heart and Distinguished Service Cross recipient, who was killed in North Africa during World War II. On May 17, 2013, prior to a game against Ole Miss, the field was named and dedicated in honor of former LSU head baseball coach and athletic director Skip Bertman.

A design team of Grace & Hebert, DLR Group, and Jeffrey L. Bruce & Company designed Alex Box Stadium, Skip Bertman Field which opened during the 2009 season.  Alex Box Stadium, Skip Bertman Field was slated to hold 8,500 fans but the addition of left field seating from Alex Box Stadium brought capacity up to 9,200.  Additional seating in right field was added before the 2010 season, bringing the total (official) capacity to 10,150. Construction of additional suites for the 2012 season brought the capacity to 10,326.

The first game of the new stadium was played February 20, 2009. LSU beat Villanova by a final score of 12–3 in front of a crowd totaling 9,054.  Alex Box Stadium, Skip Bertman Field was named the American Sports Builders Association Facility of the Year 2009.

Attendance 
In 2012, college baseball writer Eric Sorenson ranked the Alex Box Stadium as the second best big game atmosphere in college baseball behind Mississippi State's Dudy Noble Field. Stadium Journey Magazine also listed Alex Box Stadium, Skip Bertman Field among the "101 Best Stadium Experiences of 2012", the only college baseball venue so honored.

Total and Average attendance 
In 2013, the Tigers ranked 1st among Division I baseball programs in attendance, averaging a record 11,006 per home game. 

As of the 2018 baseball season, LSU has finished No. 1 in the final college baseball total attendance rankings in 23 straight seasons. LSU posted a total attendance figure of 399,085 in 37 games.

Additionally, as of the 2018 baseball season, LSU finished No. 1 in the final average attendance rankings for the 22nd time in 23 years. (Arkansas finished No. 1 in average attendance in 2007.) In 2018, LSU averaged 10,786 tickets sold per game.

Top paid attendance figures at Alex Box Stadium, Skip Bertman Field

Tournaments Hosted 
NCAA Regional Tournaments :  2009, 2012, 2013, 2014, 2015, 2016, 2017, 2019 
NCAA Super Regional Series :  2009, 2012, 2013, 2015, 2016, 2017, 2019

LSU Record at Alex Box Stadium, Skip Bertman Field

Alex Box Stadium, Skip Bertman Field v. Alex Box Stadium

Gallery

See also
LSU Tigers baseball
LSU Tigers and Lady Tigers
List of NCAA Division I baseball venues

References

External links 

 Alex Box Stadium, Skip Bertman Field at LSUSports.net
 Photos and Review on Ballparkreviews.com
 Simeon "Alex" Box at baseballinwartime.co.uk

College baseball venues in the United States
Baseball venues in Baton Rouge, Louisiana
LSU Tigers baseball venues
Sports venues completed in 2009
2009 establishments in Louisiana